Benjamin Hoffman (April 15, 1864 – May 20, 1922) was a Jewish-American lawyer, politician, and judge from New York.

Life 
Hoffman was born on April 15, 1864 in New York City, New York, the son of David L. Hoffman and Babette Heilman. His parents were both German immigrants, his father immigrating to America from Maßbach, Bavaria and his mother from Württemberg.

Hoffman graduated from the New York University School of Law with an LL.B. in 1885. He then studied law under Alfred Steckler. He was admitted to the bar in 1887, after which he practiced law with his brother Charles L. Hoffman for many years. He became a member of Tammany Hall in 1891. He lived in the Lower East Side.

In 1894, Hoffman was elected to the New York State Assembly as a Democrat, representing the New York County 6th District. He served in the Assembly in 1895, 1896, 1897, 1898, and 1899. He was a minority member of the 1899 Mazet Special Committee that investigated the affairs of New York City. In 1899, he was elected Judge of the Municipal Court. He was re-elected to the office in 1909 despite opposition from the Bar Association as he retained his political leadership. He was again elected to the office in 1919 and was still serving as Municipal Court Justice when he died.

Hoffman attended Congregation Rodeph Sholem. He was a director of the Hebrew Free Burial Association and a member of the Odd Fellows, the Freemasons, the Educational Alliance, Mt. Sinai Hospital, and the Israel Orphan Asylum. He was married to Rebecca Fuld, and their children were Belle (Mrs. Isidore Wells), Eva (Mrs. Nathan Ries), Ruth, and Joseph B. Rebecca was politically active in her own right, serving as a Democratic co-leader of the Sixth Assembly District since women gained the right to vote, a delegate to multiple Democratic National Conventions, founder, president, and treasurer of the Progress Relief Society, and Register of New York County. She was elected to the latter office in 1929, the only woman nominee in New York City to win that year, making her the highest paid woman official in the state and the first Jewish woman in the United States to be elected by a major party for a county office.

Hoffman died at home from a stroke of apoplexy on May 20, 1922. His funeral was one of the largest in the Lower East Side at the time, with over 5,000 people watching the funeral procession. The pallbearers were Marcus Loew, David Lazarus, Samuel Koenig, New York Supreme Court Justices Charles L. Guy, Mitchell L. Erlanger, and Leonard A. Giegerich, Justice Aaron J. Levy, Magistrate Max S. Levine, E. J. Ahearn, Henry M. Goldfogle, Senator Fitzgerald, and A. S. Rosenberg. He was buried in Linden Hill Cemetery.

References

External links 

 The Political Graveyard

1864 births
1922 deaths
American people of German-Jewish descent
New York University School of Law alumni
19th-century American lawyers
Lawyers from New York City
Jewish American attorneys
People from the Lower East Side
19th-century American politicians
Politicians from Manhattan
Democratic Party members of the New York State Assembly
Jewish American state legislators in New York (state)
19th-century American judges
20th-century American judges
New York (state) state court judges
American Freemasons
Burials in New York (state)